Longford is an electoral ward of Trafford, Greater Manchester, covering the Firswood area of Stretford and a small part of the Old Trafford area. It is bordered by the Clifford ward to the northeast, the Gorse Hill ward to the northwest, the Stretford ward to the southwest and Priory to the south.

Councillors 
As of 2021, the councillors are David Jarman (Labour), Judith Lloyd (Labour), and Sarah Haughey (Labour).

 indicates seat up for re-election.
 indicates seat up for election following resignation of sitting councillor.

Elections in the 2020s

May 2022

May 2021

Elections in the 2010s

May 2019

May 2018

May 2016

May 2015

May 2014

May 2012

May 2011

May 2010

Elections in the 2000s

May 2008

May 2007

May 2006

May 2004

May 2003

May 2002

May 2000

Elections in the 1990s

Elections in the 1980s

Elections in the 1970s

References

External links
Trafford Council

Wards of Trafford
1974 establishments in England
Stretford